Allott is a surname.

Allot or alot or A Lot may refer to:
"A Lot" (song), 2018 21 Savage song
 Alot, Madhya Pradesh, India
 Allot Communications, a company based in Hod HaSharon, Israel
 Allot (surname)

See also
Lot (disambiguation)